The Sixth Dynasty of ancient Egypt (notated Dynasty VI), along with the Third, Fourth and Fifth Dynasty, constitutes the Old Kingdom of Dynastic Egypt.

Pharaohs 
Known pharaohs of the Sixth Dynasty are listed in the table below. Manetho accords the dynasty 203 regnal years from Teti to Nitocris, while the Turin Canon assigns 181 regnal years, but with three additional kings concluding with Aba – discounting the reigns of the added Eighth Dynasty kings, this is reduced to 155 regnal years. This estimate varies between both scholar and source.

History 
The Sixth Dynasty is considered by many authorities as the last dynasty of the Old Kingdom, although The Oxford History of Ancient Egypt includes Dynasties VII and VIII as part of the Old Kingdom. Manetho writes that these kings ruled from Memphis, since their pyramids were built at Saqqara, very close one to another.

By the Fifth Dynasty, the religious institution had established itself as the dominant force in society; a trend of growth in the bureaucracy and the priesthood, and a decline in the pharaoh's power had been established during Neferirkare Kakai's reign. During Djedkare Isesi's rule, officials were endowed with greater authority—evidenced by the opulent private tombs they constructed—eventually leading to the creation of a feudal system in effect. These established trends—decentralization of authority, coupled with growth in bureaucracy—intensified during the three decades of Unas's rule, which also witnessed economic decline. This continued on into Sixth Dynasty, leading into the First Intermediate Period.

Teti 

Teti is identified as the first king of the Sixth Dynasty by Manetho, after the conclusion of the reign of Unas. He acceded to the throne in the 23rd century BC.

Teti is assigned a regnal duration of 30 or 33 years by Manetho — improbably long as the celebration of a Sed festival is not attested to, and the latest date recorded corresponds to the sixth cattle count, 12 or 13 years into his reign. The Royal Canon of Turin (RTC) gives another unlikely estimate of seven months. The archaeologist Hartwig Altenmüller mediates between Manetho and the record of the cattle count to offer a reign length of around 23 years. The Egyptologists Peter Clayton and William Smith accord 12 years to his reign.

The relationship between Teti and his predecessors remains unclear, but his wife Iput is thought to be a daughter of Unas. This would mean that Teti ascended to the throne as Unas's son-in-law. His inauguration solved a potential succession crisis, Unas had died without a male heir. Teti adopted the Horus name Seheteptawy (meaning "He who pacifies the Two Lands") to establish his reign as one of renewed political unity. The transition appears to have occurred smoothly, and Teti retained officials from his predecessors of the Fifth Dynasty, such as viziers Mehu and Kagemni who had begun their careers under Djedkare Isesi. Despite this, the RTC too inserts a break between Unas and Teti, which the Egyptologist Jaromìr Malek contends relates to a "change of location of the capital and royal residence". The capital migrated from "White Wall" to the populous suburbs further south to "Djed-isut"—derived from the name of Teti's pyramid and pyramid town, and located east of the monument. The royal residence might have been yet further south, in the valley away and across a lake from the city, east of South Saqqara—where the pyramids of Djedkare Isesi and Pepi I were built.

Teti had his daughter, Sesheshet, married to one of his viziers and later chief priest, Mereruka, a clear sign of his interest in co-operating with the noble class. Mereruka was buried close to Teti's pyramid, in a lavish tomb in North Saqqara. As part of his policy of pacification, Teti issued a decree exempting the temple at Abydos from taxation. He was the first ruler to be closely associated with the cult of Hathor at Dendera. Abroad, Teti maintained trade relations with Byblos and Nubia.

Teti commissioned the construction of a pyramid at North Saqqara. The substructure of the pyramid was very similar to Unas's and Djedkare Isesi's; it had a descending corridor and horizontal passage guarded at about the middle by three granite portcullises, leading to an antechamber flanked to its east by the serdab with its three recesses and to its west by the burial chamber containing the sarcophagus. The walls of the chambers and a section of the horizontal passage were inscribed with Pyramid Texts, as in Unas' pyramid. The mortuary temple, with the exception of its entrance, conforms to the same basic plans as his predecessors. The complex contained a cult pyramid to the south-east of the pyramid with base length . The causeway connecting to the mortuary temple is yet to be excavated, while the valley temple and pyramid town are entirely missing. Teti's pyramid became the site of a large necropolis, and included the pyramids of his wives Neith and Iput, mother of Pepi I. Iput's skeleton was discovered buried in her pyramid in a wooden coffin.

Manetho claims that Teti was assassinated by a bodyguard, but no contemporary sources confirm this. The story, if true, might explain the references to the ephemeral ruler Userkare, proposed to have briefly reigned between Teti and Pepi I. Userkare is attested to in the Royal Turin Canon and Abydos king-list, and is mentioned in several contemporaneous documents.

Pepi I 
During this dynasty, expeditions were sent to Wadi Maghara in the Sinai Peninsula to mine for turquoise and copper, as well as to the mines at Hatnub and Wadi Hammamat. The pharaoh Djedkara sent trade expeditions south to Punt and north to Byblos, and Pepi I sent expeditions not only to these locations, but also as far as Ebla in modern-day Syria.

Pepi II 
The most notable member of this dynasty was Pepi II, who is credited with a reign of 94 years.

Nitiqret 
Also known by the Greek name Nitocris, this woman is believed by some authorities to have been not only the first female pharaoh but the first queen in the world, although it is currently accepted that her name is actually a mistranslation of the king Neitiqerty Siptah.

The rise of the nobility 
With the growing number of biographical inscriptions in non-royal tombs, our knowledge of the contemporary history broadens. For example, we hear of an unsuccessful plot against Pepi I. We also read a letter written by the young king Pepi II, excited that one of his expeditions will return with a dancing pygmy from the land of Yam, located to the south of Nubia.

These non-royal tomb inscriptions are but one example of the growing power of the nobility, which further weakened the absolute rule of the king. As a result, it is believed that on the death of the long-lived Pepi II his vassals were entrenched enough to resist the authority of his many successors, which may have contributed to the rapid decline of the Old Kingdom.

Notes

References

Sources 

 
06
06
06
3rd-millennium BC establishments in Egypt
3rd-millennium BC disestablishments in Egypt
3rd millennium BC in Egypt
06
States and territories established in the 3rd millennium BC
States and territories disestablished in the 3rd millennium BC

de:Altes Reich#6. Dynastie